Clare Warren (born 1977) is a British geologist who is Professor of Earth Sciences at the Open University. Her research considers metamorphic petrology and how deeply buried rocks record information about their burial and exhumation. She was awarded the Geological Society of London Dewey Medal in 2022.

Early life and education 
Warren was an undergraduate student at the University of Oxford, where she studied earth sciences. After graduating she moved to University College London, where she earned a master's degree in hydrogeology. She remained in Oxford for her graduate research, where she investigated the Arabian continental margin underneath Semail Ophiolite. After graduating Warren joined Dalhousie University as a Killam Fellow.

Research and career 
Warren joined the Open University in 2011 as a Natural Environment Research Council advanced postdoctoral fellow. Her early research considered how quickly Indian continental crust was buried underneath Tibet. This work led her to focus her career on understanding the processes that occur when continents collide or mountains form. She studies metamorphic petrology, including mineral scale processes and large scale tectonics. This has included studying argon diffusion and ultra-high-pressure metamorphism (UHP) rocks. Her work on the exhumation of UHP rocks has identified new mechanisms.

Warren serves as lead of the Open University Dynamic Earth Research Group. She was made a Professor of Metamorphic Geology in 2020.

Awards and honours 
 2020 Mineralogical Society of Great Britain and Ireland UK Metamorphic Studies Group Barrow Award
 2022 Geological Society of London Dewey Medal

Selected publications

References 

Living people
Alumni of the University of Oxford
Academic staff of the Dalhousie University
Academics of the Open University
British earth scientists
British women scientists
21st-century scientists
1977 births
British geologists